Movies, TV shows, and documentaries filmed in Baltimore:

Absolute Power
The Accidental Tourist
Ace of Cakes
Airline
Along Came a Spider
Amazing Grace (1974)
America's Most Wanted
...And Justice For All
Avalon
Ax 'Em
Beauty Shop
The Bedroom Window
Boys
Cecil B. DeMented
Clara's Heart
The Corner
Cry-Baby
The Curve
Dave
Desperate Living
Detention
Diner
Diners, Drive-Ins and Dives
A Dirty Shame
The Distinguished Gentleman
Divine Trash
Enemy of the State
Failure to Launch
Female Trouble
First Invasion: War of 1812
First Sunday
For Richer or Poorer (1997)
Gods and Generals
Guarding Tess
Hag in a Black Leather Jacket
Hairspray (1988 version)
He Said, She Said
Head of State
Her Alibi
He's Just Not That Into You
Home for the Holidays
Homicide
Homicide: Life on the Street
Homicide: The Movie
Hook, Line and Dinner
House of Cards
The Invasion
House on Sorority Row
Ladder 49
 Liberty
Liberty Heights
The Life of Bailey
Live Free or Die Hard
Major League II
Marnie
Maxum Xul
Men
Men Don't Leave
The Meteor Man
Mondo Trasho
The Mosquito Coast
Multiple Maniacs
On the Block
Pecker
The Photon Effect 
Pink Flamingos
Polyester
Princess
Putty Hill
Random Hearts
Red Dragon
The Replacements
Roc
Roulette
Runaway Bride
The Salon
Satisfaction
The Seduction of Joe Tynan
Serial Mom
 The Service
Shooter
Shot in the Heart
Silent Fall
Sleepless in Seattle
Something the Lord Made
Species II
Stage Fright
Step Up
Step Up 2: The Streets
The Sum of All Fears
That Night
Tin Men
Tuck Everlasting
Twelve Monkeys
Violets Are Blue
Veep
Washington Square
While You Were Out
The Wire
XXX: State of the Union
The Young Americans

See also

References

 
Baltimore
Films shot in Baltimore